Creeping charlie is a common name for several species of flowering plants:
Glechoma hederacea, also known as "ground ivy", in the family Lamiaceae
Pilea nummulariifolia, in the family Urticaceae
Plectranthus verticillatus, in the family Lamiaceae